Andreas Penkner (born 29 November 1982) is a German rower. He competed in the men's eight event at the 2008 Summer Olympics.

References

External links
 

1982 births
Living people
German male rowers
Olympic rowers of Germany
Rowers at the 2008 Summer Olympics
People from Radolfzell
Sportspeople from Freiburg (region)